SS Ralph Creyke was a passenger and freight vessel built for the Goole Steam Shipping Company in 1879.

History

She replaced a vessel of the same name  built in 1878 which had foundered in 1879 off Lundy Island. The replacement ship was built by Short Brothers, Sunderland for the Goole Steam Shipping Company and launched in July 1879.

In 1905 she was acquired by the Lancashire and Yorkshire Railway. In December 1902 a fire broke out in the hold as she was coming up the River Humber. On reaching Hull, Captain Campbell moored up alongside the Albert Dock Promenade and the North-Eastern and Police Fire Brigades arrived and fought the fire for several hours.

Ralph Creyke was sold in 1909. Her captain, Edward Atkinson formed the Ouse Steamship Company, and she was the first ship of this new company.

On 28 August 1912, Ralph Creyke′s sister ship  was anchored midstream at Goole waiting to enter the lock when a strong southerly wind caused Derwent to sheer into Ralph Creyke, which was outbound with a full cargo of coal. Derwent’s anchor chain became caught in Ralph Creyke’s propeller and her engines were stopped. The accident required Ralph Creyke to be drydocked to undergo expensive repairs to remove the chain.

After the completion of repairs, Ralph Creyke returned to service, but on 16 October 1912, less than two months after her collision with Derwent, she sank in the North Sea near Flushing, the Netherlands, after a collision with the Danish steamer Viking.

References

1879 ships
Steamships of the United Kingdom
Ships built on the River Wear
Ships of the Lancashire and Yorkshire Railway
Maritime incidents in 1912
Ships sunk in collisions
Shipwrecks in the North Sea